Aakhri Daao is a 1975 Indian Hindi-language crime film, directed by A. Salaam, written by Salim–Javed, and produced by M.M. Malhotra Kala Bharathi. It stars Jeetendra, Saira Banu in lead roles, with Danny Denzongpa, Padma Khanna, Ranjeet in supporting roles and music composed by Laxmikant–Pyarelal. The film is based on Bhagwati Charan Verma's 1950 novel of the same name.

Plot
Ravi (Jeetendra) is professional safecracker. In one of heists, the owner of the safe is murdered by the cunning duo of Sawan (Danny Dengzongpa) and Julie (Padma Khanna). Ravi becomes implicated in the murder despite being innocent. He decides to abscond and lands in a remote estate owned by a rich man (Satyendra Kapoor). He becomes the estate's manager. Reena (Saira Banu), the daughter of the estate owner, grows to respect Ravi and eventually they fall in love. Sawan and Julie also arrive at the estate and soon they try to blackmail Ravi into burgling the safe of his employer. They succeed in scaring him into submission and he agrees to pull this one final heist for them. Meanwhile, Reena finds out the truth and lashes out at him for his duplicity. She eventually understands that Ravi is not a bad person at heart. Sawan, sensing Ravi's reluctance, decides to coerce him into cracking the safe by threatening to harm Reena. He eventually betrays his accomplice Julie who confesses to their misdeeds to the police as she lies mortally wounded. Ravi gives chase to Sawan. He manages to subdue him and recover what they had stolen from the estate's safe. Ravi is acquitted of all previous charges and gets married to his lady love, Reena.

Cast
Jeetendra as Ravi
Saira Banu as Reena
Danny Denzongpa as Sawan
Padma Khanna as Julie
Ranjeet as Dilawar Singh
Ramesh Deo as Inspector Verma
Iftekhar as Inspector Khurana
Satyendra Kapoor as Reena's Father
Mohan Choti as Tannu

Soundtrack

References

External links
 

1975 films
1970s Hindi-language films
1975 romantic drama films
1975 crime drama films
Films scored by Laxmikant–Pyarelal
Films with screenplays by Salim–Javed
Indian romantic drama films
Indian crime drama films
Hindi-language crime films